"If Your Girl Only Knew" is a song recorded by American singer Aaliyah for her second studio album, One in a Million (1996). The song was written by both Missy Elliott and Timbaland, with the latter producing the song. Musically, "If Your Girl Only Knew" is a "bouncing" funk, pop and hip hop song featuring keyboard and organ work along with guitar licks. Lyrically, the song is about a girl chiding a man for hitting on her when he already has a girlfriend. The song was released as the lead single from One in a Million on July 15, 1996, by Blackground Records and Atlantic Records.

Upon its release, the song was met with generally positive reviews from critics, with many praising Aaliyah's vocal performance. Commercially "If Your Girl Only Knew" performed well, peaking at number 11 on the US Billboard Hot 100 and atop the US Hot R&B/Hip-Hop Songs, selling over 600,000 copies in the United States by the end of 1996. Internationally, "If Your Girl Only Knew" was a moderate success, peaking at number 21 on the UK Singles Chart as a standalone single and at number 15 as a double single with "One in a Million".

Music and lyrics
"If Your Girl Only Knew" is a funk  and pop song, that has been described by critics as being "teasingly witchy" and "sassy". Meanwhile, Quinn Peterson from Jet labeled the song as a "bouncing" hip-hop record.  The production on the song features a "slap bass melody over boom bap drums accentuated by hand claps over the snares and clattering cymbals and hi hats". In addition, the song's production features "retro" funk guitar licks and an organ that's prominent throughout the song. While discussing the musical direction for One in a Million, Aaliyah stated in an interview with Billboard: "I wanted to maintain my smooth street musical image but wanted to be funky and hot yet sophisticated". "If Your Girl Only Knew" was described by Atlantic Records product development director Eddie Santiago as "a very funky mid-tempo track with lots of heavy keyboard and organ work along with live drums and a thumping bass line". The song was produced by Timbaland and was one of the earliest songs Aaliyah recorded with him for the album, alongside "One in a Million".

On "If Your Girl Only Knew", Aaliyah "reveals a more assured and fully realized vocal style, as well as a more flexible note range". She utilizes her lower register more which is "stronger and full of seductive power", as she chides a man for hitting on her when he already has a girlfriend. "The content is raw, with melodies aplenty throughout, with key lyrics like 'She would probably leave you alone/She would probably curse you out and unplug her phone/I bet she'd be glad that you was gone/And then she wouldn't have to worry'". According to Quentin B. Huff from popmatters, "Aaliyah's narration isn't completely disinterested in his advances ("If your girl only knew / that I would want to kick it with you") but something tells me this guy is running the risk that she'll tell his girlfriend what's been going on". Overall, the song is "part ladies' anthem-I'm not going to help you cheat on you girl, part humble brag-I could have your man if I really wanted him".

Release and promotion
Promotional single copies of "If Your Girl Only Knew" were serviced to urban contemporary radio on July 12, 1996, and the song was digitally uploaded to the stations on July 15. It was commercially released in the United States on August 13 as a 12-inch vinyl, cassette and maxi CD single by Blackground Records and Atlantic Records.

According to the Atlantic Records vice president Manny Bella, "Every component of the project – including the video, a television campaign, and other promotions – was in place before the single went to radio". In order to promote the single, Aaliyah went a promotional radio tour during which she connected with  the radio audience, with Bella stating: "Aaliyah rode a tour bus through several markets and connected to radio in every one". Topics Aaliyah discussed while on radio included issues related to education; Blackground Records' president and Aaliyah's uncle Barry Hankerson stated: "While at the stations she discussed fundamental issues on air, such as getting good grades in school and how she balances school and her career".

In August 2021, it was reported that the album and Aaliyah's other recorded work for Blackground (since rebranded as Blackground Records 2.0) would be re-released on physical and digital formats in a deal between the label and Empire Distribution; it marked the first time most of Aaliyah's discography was being made available for streaming. One in a Million was reissued on August 20, 2021, despite Aaliyah's estate issuing a statement in response to Blackground 2.0's announcement, denouncing the "unscrupulous endeavor to release Aaliyah's music without any transparency or full accounting to the estate".

Live performances
In September 1996, Aaliyah made an appearance at MTV's sixth annual Rock N' Jock event, which aired on October 26. During the event, she participated in a celebrity basketball game and performed "If Your Girl Only Knew" during the half-time show. On October 11, 1996, Aaliyah performed the song on Soul Train. On February 21, 1997, Aaliyah performed "If Your girl Only Knew" and "One in a Million", on Showtime at the Apollo.

Critical reception
In his review of the song, Larry Flick from Billboard described it as a "wickedly infectious jeep chugger" and felt that Aaliyah's break from public view in between albums was "well spent". He also praised Aaliyah's vocal styling, saying: "She reveals a more assured and fully realized vocal style as well as a more flexible note range". Peter Miro from Cash Box wrote, "Her bubble-bursting message is all the more meaningful given her soulfully rendered lyrics. Its arrangement makes effective use of pauses and refrains, making for a palatable, stand-alone ditty." Shannon Marcec from Complex felt that Aaliyah delivered her sweet but haunting vocals on one of Timbaland's best beats. Marcec also mentioned that the lyrics made the song one of Aaliyah's hottest songs. Dimitri Ehrlich of Entertainment Weekly described the song as a "low-key funk tune" and commended the overall message of the song, writing: "The message is an enduring one and the sparse, robotic rhythm is entrancing". In a review of One in a Million, Connie Johnson of the Los Angeles Times called the song "teasingly witchy". British magazine Music Week rated it four out of five, picking it as "the highlight track" from the album. Quentin B. Huff from PopMatters felt that on the song that "Aaliyah sounds amused, playful even, and if his girlfriend didn't already know about his shenanigans, I gotta believe she would have figured it out when she heard the song in heavy radio rotation (smirk). When you think about it that way, this is a nightmare for this guy, but funny for us -- he tries to "kick it" with Aaliyah and gets his attempt at being a player broadcast in one of her songs". In a retrospective review by Billboard, the publication praised Aaliyah's vocal delivery stating, "Singing in a guttural register and sounding more self-assured than ever, Aaliyah’s verses should make the grown man at the other end cower, but a flirtatious streak runs through her teasing when she sings lines like If your girl only knew/ That I would want to kick it with you."

Commercial performance
"If Your Girl Only Knew" debuted on the US Billboard Hot 100 at number 34 during the week of August 31, 1996. The song reached its peak at number 11 eight weeks later on the chart dated October 19. On the Hot R&B/Hip-Hop Songs chart, the song debuted at number 12 the week of August 31. On September 28, it reached its peak at number one, remaining atop the chart for two consecutive weeks. According to Datu Faison from Billboard, "Key factors leading to Aaliyah's big 5–1 leap include a 20% unit increase at R&B core stores, which pushes an identical 5–1 jump on hot R&B singles sales. Audience impressions increase another 9%, moving the record 9–7 on Hot R&B airplay". The song also peaked at number six on the Rhythmic Top 40 during the week of November 2. Towards the end of 1996, it was reported by Billboard that the single had sold over 600,000 copies in the United States.

Internationally, "If Your Girl Only Knew" originally peaked at number 21 on the UK Singles Chart on August 24, 1996. In 1997, the single was re-released as a double A-side single with "One in a Million" and reached a new peak position at number 15 on May 24, 1997. The song also peaked at number six on the UK Dance Chart on August 18, 1996, and at number four on the UK R&B Chart on August 25, 1996.
 According to the Official Charts Company (OCC), the "If Your Girl Only Knew" standalone single is Aaliyah's tenth best-selling single in the United Kingdom, while the double single is her sixth. "If Your Girl Only Knew" also peaked at number 20 in New Zealand on October 20, 1996.

Following its 2021 digital release, "If Your Girl Only Knew" debuted at number 15 on the US Digital Song Sales chart for the week of September 4, 2021.

Music video

Background
The music video for "If Your Girl Only Knew", directed by Joseph Kahn, was sent to local and national video shows on July 8, 1996. The video featured cameos from  celebrities such as Missy Elliott, Timbaland, 702, Lil' Kim and Aaliyah's brother Rashad Haughton. In an interview with Vibe, Kameelah Williams from 702 recalled that either Aaliyah or Elliott invited the group to be a part of the video. According to Williams, she and her bandmates were told they would be riding on motorcycles and that they had to wear all-black outfits. Williams also had a solo cameo in the video, in which she is shown arguing with her on-screen boyfriend in an elevator. Williams explained: "She gave me a little cameo so I was like, 'Okay, that’s my home girl.' She let me do a little scene by myself with this guy fighting in the elevator so that was my little Aaliyah cameo".

Synopsis
The video begins with Aaliyah, her brother, and their clique arriving to  a party on motorcycles. She wears a dark leather outfit with her trademark sunglasses and bandana. Scenes include Aaliyah sitting in a futuristic chair, at a party (the party scene is shot in black-and-white, but Aaliyah remains in color), Aaliyah and various others in an elevator, and also a close-up of Aaliyah's face. Color editing is used on her eyes here, and they change color towards the end of the video.

Reception
The music video for "If Your Girl Only Knew" made its television debut on both BET and The Box for the week ending July 21, 1996. Eventually, the video was the 16th most-played video on BET for the week ending September 8, 1996. On MTV, the video made its television debut on the network for the week ending July 28, 1996. For the week ending October 6, 1996, the video was the 28th most-played video on MTV.

Legacy
 
"If Your Girl Only Knew" was featured in the sports comedy-drama film Varsity Blues (1999). In 2016, Swedish singer-songwriter Erik Hassle paid tribute to Aaliyah by releasing his own version of the song, entitled "If Your Man Only Knew". "If Your Man Only Knew" was written by Hassle, Daniel Ledinsky and Alexander Shuckburgh. According to Brennan Carley from Spin, "Hassle also knows his way around a solo hook too, and his new song "If Your Man Only Knew" is gorgeous proof. At ends both melancholic and resentful, the tune's a big, bold, front-and-center vocal showcase for the singer". Both Lewis Corner and Amy Davidson from Digital Spy praised the song by saying "it's a cool slice of R&B-pop" and that the song would do well in the contemporary music climate.

Track listings and formats

 US and Japanese maxi CD single
"If Your Girl Only Knew" (album version) – 4:50
"If Your Girl Only Knew" (extended mix) – 8:03
"If Your Girl Only Knew" (remix) – 4:43
"If Your Girl Only Knew" (Beat A Pella) – 4:50
"If Your Girl Only Knew" (instrumental) – 4:42

 US 12-inch vinyl
"If Your Girl Only Knew" (album version) – 4:50
"If Your Girl Only Knew" (extended mix) – 8:03
"If Your Girl Only Knew" (The New Remix) – 4:58
"If Your Girl Only Knew" (remix) – 4:43
"If Your Girl Only Knew" (Beat A Pella) – 4:50
"If Your Girl Only Knew" (instrumental) – 4:42

 European 12-inch vinyl and maxi CD single and Australian maxi CD single
"If Your Girl Only Knew" (radio edit) – 3:55
"If Your Girl Only Knew" (extended mix) – 8:03
"If Your Girl Only Knew" (Beat A Pella) – 4:50
"If Your Girl Only Knew" (instrumental) – 4:42
"If Your Girl Only Knew" (a cappella) – 4:27

 French CD single
"If Your Girl Only Knew" (radio edit) – 3:55
"If Your Girl Only Knew" (extended mix) – 8:03
"If Your Girl Only Knew" (instrumental) – 4:42
"If Your Girl Only Knew" (The New Remix) – 4:58

 "If Your Girl Only Knew"/"One in a Million"
"If Your Girl Only Knew" (radio edit) – 3:55
"If Your Girl Only Knew" (The New Remix) – 4:58
"One in a Million" (Dark Child Remix) – 4:41
"One in a Million" (Armand's Drum & Bass Mix) – 7:11

Charts

Weekly charts

Year-end charts

Certifications and sales

|}

Release history

See also
 List of number-one R&B singles of 1996 (U.S.)

Notes

References

Bibliography

External links
 Official music video on YouTube

1996 singles
Aaliyah songs
Music videos directed by Joseph Kahn
Song recordings produced by Timbaland
Songs written by Missy Elliott
Songs written by Timbaland
1996 songs
Blackground Records singles
Funk songs
Songs about infidelity